Sheen is a surname. Notable people with the surname include:

Barry Sheen (1918–2005), British judge
Bobby Sheen (1941–2000), American singer
Caroline Sheen (born 1975), Welsh actress
Daniel R. Sheen (1852-1926), American politician and lawyer
Danielle Sheen (born 1990), English footballer
Derek Sheen, American stand-up comedian
Edna Sheen (1944–2012), American make-up artist
Fulton J. Sheen (1895–1979), American Catholic archbishop, television evangelist, sainthood candidate
Gillian Sheen (1928–2021), British fencer (won Olympic gold)
Graham Sheen (born 1952), British bassoonist
Grant Sheen (born 1974), English cricketer
Jacqueline Sheen (born 1963), American model
Janet Sheen (born 1944), American actress and producer
Martin Sheen (originally Esteves, born 1940), American actor 
Charlie Sheen (born 1965), American actor, son of Martin
Michael Sheen (born 1969), Welsh actor
Mickey Sheen (1927–1987), American jazz drummer
Ruth Sheen (born 1952), English actress

Fictional characters:
Emma Sheen, a character in the anime series Mobile Suit Zeta Gundam